Christopher Haydock (by 1499 – 1566 or later) was an English politician.

He was the son of Gilbert Haydock of Cottam, near Preston, Lancashire. He was elected Mayor of Preston from 1528 to 1531. He was elected a Member (MP) of the Parliament of England for Preston in 1529.

Haydock was married with at least two sons.

References

15th-century births
1566 deaths
Year of death unknown
Mayors of Preston, Lancashire
English MPs 1529–1536